Telle Bridge, also spelled as Tele Bridge, is a border post located between South Africa and Lesotho.

The actual steel motorbridge spans the Telle River, a tributary of the Orange River that flows across half of South Africa.

The anti-apartheid South African journalist and editor of the Daily Dispatch, Donald Woods entered Lesotho through the Telle Bridge as he was fleeing from  South Africa on New Year's Eve, 1977.

References

Lesotho–South Africa border crossings